Conizonia mounai is a species of beetle in the family Cerambycidae. It was described by Sama in 2005. It is known from Morocco.

References

Saperdini
Beetles described in 2005